The 136th Attack Squadron (136 ATKS) is a unit of the New York Air National Guard 107th Attack Wing located at Niagara Falls Joint Air Reserve Station, New York. The 136th is equipped with the MQ-9 Reaper. If activated to federal service, the Wing is gained by the United States Air Force's Air Combat Command.

The 136th is now part of the Texas Air National Guard

History

World War II
The squadron was first activated at Hunter Field, Georgia, as the 482d Bombardment Squadron, a Third Air Force Operational Training Unit (OTU), equipped with A-24 Banshee dive bombers. It moved to California in September 1943 as part of Desert Training Center in Mojave Desert.

After the A-24 was taken out of combat service, the squadron trained with Bell P-39 Airacobras and became combat ready as the 503d Fighter-Bomber Squadron, and became part of VIII Fighter Command in England in April 1944. It re-equipped with North American P-51 Mustangs, with a mission to escort Boeing B-17 Flying Fortress and Consolidated B-24 Liberator heavy bombers during its first five weeks of operations, and afterwards flew escort missions to cover the operations of medium and heavy bombers that struck strategic objectives, interdicted the enemy's communications, or supported operations on the ground.

The squadron frequently strafed airfields and other targets of opportunity while on escort missions. Provided fighter cover over the English Channel and the coast of Normandy during the invasion of France in June 1944. Strafed and dive-bombed vehicles, locomotives, marshalling yards, anti-aircraft batteries, and troops while Allied forces fought to break out of the beachhead in France. It attacked transportation targets as Allied armies drove across France after the breakthrough at Saint-Lô in July. The 503d flew area patrols during Operation Market-Garden, the airborne attack on the Netherlands in September.  It escorted bombers to, and flew patrols, over the battle area during the German counterattack in the Ardennes (Battle of the Bulge), December 1944 – January 1945.  It provided area patrols during Operation Varsity, the assault across the Rhine in March 1945.  The squadron returned to the United States in October and was inactivated on 18 October 1945.

New York Air National Guard

The wartime 503d Fighter Squadron was redesignated as the 136th Fighter Squadron, and was allotted to the New York Air National Guard, on 24 May 1946. It was organized at Niagara Falls Municipal Airport, New York, and was extended federal recognition on 8 December 1948.  The squadron was equipped with F-47D Thunderbolts and was assigned to the 107th Fighter Group, operationally gained by Continental Air Command.

The mission of the 136th Fighter Squadron was the air defense of Western New York. Aircraft parts were no problem and many of the maintenance personnel were World War II veterans so readiness was quite high and the planes were often much better maintained than their USAF counterparts. In some ways, the postwar Air National Guard was almost like a flying country club and a pilot could often show up at the field, check out an aircraft and go flying. However, the unit also had regular military exercises that kept up proficiency and in gunnery and bombing contests they would often score at least as well or better than active-duty USAF units, given the fact that most Guard pilots were World War II combat veterans.

Korean War activation
With the surprise invasion of South Korea on 25 June 1950, and the regular military's lack of readiness, most of the Air National Guard was federalized placed on active duty.   The 136th was federalized on 2 March 1951, and assigned to the federalized 101st Fighter-Interceptor Group of the Maine Air National Guard at Dow Air Force Base, Maine.  In February 1952, the squadron was reassigned to the 4708th Air Defense Wing, which was located at Selfridge Air Force Base, Michigan. On 1 November 1952 the squadron was released from active duty and its air defense mission, personnel and P-47s were transferred to the 47th Fighter-Interceptor Squadron, which was simultaneously activated at Niagara Falls.

Air Defense

The unit was reformed at Niagara Falls by 1 January 1953 and was re-equipped with the F-51H Mustang very long range fighter.  The air defense mission for western New York remained and the unit resumed normal peacetime training and drills.  In 1954, the Mustang was ending its service life and Air Defense Command was re-equipping its fighter-interceptor squadrons with jet aircraft.   The 136th received F-94B Starfires, however the F-94 required a two-man aircrew a pilot and an air observer to operate its radar equipment. Trainees for the radar assignment had to attend regular Air Force training schools, and required virtually the same qualifications as the pilot trainees.  The additional recruitment of guardsmen led to the units having a manning and capabilities problem that lasted for some time until the unit was returned to full readiness.

In 1956, the 107th Fighter-Interceptor Wing was reorganized and redesignated as the 107th Air Defense Wing. The reorganization resulted in the activation of two new fighter groups, the 107th Fighter-Interceptor Group was redesignated the 107th Fighter Group (AD) and moved from Niagara Falls to Hancock Field in Syracuse, although the 136th Fighter-Interceptor Squadron remained at Niagara Falls and was assigned directly to the wing. The F-86H Sabre replaced the F-94B Starfires in 1957.

Tactical Air Command

A major change to the 136th Fighter-Interceptor Squadron in 1958 was the transition from an Air Defense Command mission to Tactical Air Command (TAC) and a tactical fighter mission, with the 136th being redesignated as the 137th Tactical Fighter Squadron. The new assignment involved a change in the squadron's training mission to include high-altitude interception, air-to-ground rocketry, ground strafing and tactical bombing.  The squadron retained F-86H Sabres until 1960, when TAC replaced the F-86H with the F-100C Super Sabre.

In 1962, the 107th Tactical Fighter Group moved back to Niagara Falls, with the activation of the 174th Tactical Fighter Group at Syracuse and the 136th was again assigned to it.   Six F-100 fighters of the 136th deployed to Hickam Air Force Base, Hawaii in 1965 for Operation Tropic Lighting I.  The squadron provided close air support for jungle warfare training of the U. S. Army's 25th Division in Hawaii prior to their combat deployment to South Vietnam The Niagara jets were flown across the Pacific and refueled twice in flight, marking the first time an Air National Guard unit has performed such a mission.

In January 1968, the 136th Tactical Fighter Squadron was federalized in the wake of the USS Pueblo crisis.  It first deployed to Homestead Air Force Base, Florida for gunnery and close air ground support training in April.  In June, the squadron moved to Tuy Hoa Air Base, South Vietnam to reinforce the 31st Tactical Fighter Wing.  It was joined at Tuy Hoa by the New Mexico ANG 188th Tactical Fighter Squadron.  In South Vietnam, the squadron carried the tail code "SG" on its F-100s.  From Tuy Hoa, the squadron conducted combat operations, carried out interdiction strikes, conducted visual and photo reconnaissance, rescue combat air patrols, and suppressed enemy antiaircraft artillery. The squadron also conducted air operations against enemy forces during the 1968 Tet Offensive and the Siege of Khe Sanh from February–April 1968. It flew close air support missions during the extraction of friendly troops from Kham Duc on 12 May 1968.

In South Vietnam, three squadron members were awarded the Purple Heart; one the Distinguished Flying Cross; and 43 received Air Medals. The New York State Medal of Valor was awarded posthumously to Captain Joseph L'Hullier of the 136th for heroism in Vietnam. Captain L'Hullier became the first New York Air National Guardsman to be killed in action while on active duty with a mobilized Air Guard organization since World War II. He died while on a combat fighter support mission.  The squadron was returned to its home base of Niagara Falls in late May and returned to state control on 11 June 1969. In a final, moving tribute to their four fallen comrades – three pilots of the 136th killed in training, and one in action – F-100s from the 169th Tactical Fighter Group, South Carolina Air National Guard, flew over the demobilization ceremonies in the "missing man" formation.

NORAD Air Defense

The 136th Tactical Fighter Squadron returned to an air defense mission in June 1971 when it received F-101B Voodoo interceptors and rejoined Aerospace Defense Command (ADCOM).  In 1972, after the completion of the transition to the Voodoo from the F-100s, the 136th Fighter-Interceptor Squadron began operating on a 24-hour-a-day, 365 days a year alert as part of North American Air Defense Command (NORAD).  In 1979, ADCOM was inactivated and the air defense mission was assumed by Tactical Air Command.  The 107th FIG became gained by Air Defense, Tactical Air Command, which functioned at the Numbered Air Force echelon of TAC.  In 1981 the 136th was re-equipped with F-4C Phantom IIs and in 1982 returned to NORAD alert status.

The 136th received more advanced F-4D Phantom IIs in 1986.  Beginning in July, a detachment was formed to provide air defense alert at Charleston AFB, South Carolina.  With the detachment at Charleston, the 136th was on a 24/365 alert over a 1,480-mile round-trip area.  Interceptors from Charleston monitored Soviet Air Force Tupolev Tu-95 "Bear" Bombers flying down the Atlantic seacoast to and from airfields in Cuba. The 136th also deployed to Ramstein Air Base, West Germany to perform an Air Defense Alert Mission in Operation Creek Klaxon.  Squadrons from he Air National Guard rotated deployments and stood alert duties for just over a year at Ramstein while the resident 86th Tactical Fighter Wing converted to F-16C/D Fighting Falcons. The 86 TFW resumed alert duties on 1 April 1987.

The 136th replaced its Vietnam Era F-4D Phantom II fighter aircraft with 20 Block 15 F-16 Fighting Falcon fighters configured as air defense fighters in 1990.  Personnel and aircraft deployed to Jacksonville Air National Guard Base, Florida, taking advantage of the better weather conditions to accelerate the F-16 conversion.

Due to its air defense commitment, the 136th was not mobilized during the 1991 Gulf Crisis. However, the 107th Fighter-Interceptor Group deployed firefighter and medical personnel as backfilled personnel to stateside bases
vacated by active-duty personnel deployed to the Middle East.

In 1992, the 136th was redesignated as the 136th Fighter Squadron.   On 1 October 1995, the Air National Guard adopted the Air Force Objective Organization plan, and the squadron was assigned to the new 107th Operations Group.

With the arrival of the KC-135R Stratotanker in March 1994, the 136th Fighter Squadron converted from an air defense mission to aerial refueling and was redesignated as the 136th Air Refueling Squadron.  The 136th provided support for worldwide air refueling missions. When called upon, the 136th also used the KC-135R as a cargo and passenger transport.

In mid-1996, the Air Force, in response to budget cuts, and changing world situations, began experimenting with Air Expeditionary organizations. The Air Expeditionary Force (AEF) concept was developed that would mix Active-Duty, Reserve and Air National Guard elements into a combined force. Instead of entire permanent units deploying as "Provisional" as in the 1991 Gulf War, expeditionary units are composed of "aviation packages" from several wings, including active-duty Air Force, the Air Force Reserve Command and the Air National Guard, would be married together to carry out the assigned deployment rotation.

Since 1996, the 136th Expeditionary Air Refueling Squadron, with the 136th being the major force provider, was formed and deployed in support of world contingencies including Operations to include, but not limited to, Strong Resolve 2002, Operation Uphold Democracy, Operation Deny Flight, Operation Decisive Endeavor, Operation Noble Eagle, Operation Enduring Freedom, Operation Iraqi Freedom and the Northeast Tanker Task Force.

Twenty-first century 

In November 2007, the 107th was notified that it would become an airlift unit. This was directed by the Base Realignment and Closure of 2005.  It became an associate unit to the Air Force Reserve Command 914th Airlift Wing, already based at Niagara Falls.  The 914th has had responsibility for the C-130H2 Hercules aircraft used by the 136th, and airmen from both units jointly operate them.  With this change, the Niagara Falls Air Reserve Station received additional C-130 aircraft from the Tennessee Air National Guard's 118th Airlift Wing in Nashville. Tennessee.   The 136th Expeditionary Airlift Squadron has deployed to both Iraq and Afghanistan in support of Operation Iraqi Freedom and Operation Enduring Freedom.

During Hurricane Sandy in late October 2012, members of the unit deployed to New York City and Long Island to assist in recovery operations.  The unit was deployed first to Stewart Air National Guard Base in Newburgh and then traveled to Peekskill, which is in Westchester County.  As part of the recovery effort, unit members performed road clearing, traffic control, helping displaced personnel with feeding and getting them back in their housing and getting them out of flood-stricken areas.

It was announced in early 2012 that federal budget reductions would affect the mission of the 107th Airlift Wing.  The future of the unit is presently being discussed by New York representatives and the Air Force.

Lineage

 Constituted as the 482d Bombardment Squadron  (Dive) on 3 August 1942
 Activated on 10 August 1942
 Redesignated 503d Fighter-Bomber Squadron on 10 August 1943
 Redesignated 503d Fighter Squadron, Single Engine on 30 May 1944
 Inactivated on 7 November 1945
 Redesignated: 136th Fighter Squadron, Single Engine and allotted to the National Guard on 24 May 1946.
 Activated and received federal recognition on 8 December 1948
 Federalized and ordered to active service on 2 March 1951
 Redesignated 136th Fighter-Interceptor Squadron c. 2 March 1951
 Inactivated and released from active duty and returned to New York state control on 1 December 1952
 Activated on 1 December 1952
 Redesignated: 136th Tactical Fighter Squadron (Special Delivery) on 10 November 1958
 Redesignated: 136th Tactical Fighter Squadron c. 15 October 1962
 Federalized and ordered to active service on 26 January 1968
 Inactivated, released from active duty and returned to New York state control on 11 June 1969
 Redesignated 136th Fighter-Interceptor Squadron on 1 June 1971
 Redesignated 136th Fighter Squadron on 16 March 1992
 Redesignated 136th Air Refueling Squadron on 1 July 1994
 Redesignated 136th Airlift Squadron on 1 July 2008

Assignments
 339th Bombardment (later Fighter-Bomber; Fighter) Group, 10 August 1942 – 18 October 1945
 107th Fighter Group, 8 December 1948
 101st Fighter-Interceptor Group, 2 March 1951
 4708th Defense Wing, 6 February 1952
 107th Fighter-Interceptor Group, 1 December 1952
 107th Air Defense Wing, 1 May 1956
 107th Tactical Fighter Group, 10 November 1958
 140th Tactical Fighter Wing, 26 January 1968
 31st Tactical Fighter Wing, 14 June 1968
 107th Tactical Fighter Group (later Fighter-Interceptor Group, Fighter Group, Air Refueling Group), 11 June 1969
 107th Operations Group, 1 October 1995 – Present

Stations

 Hunter Field, Georgia, 10 Aug 1942
 Drew Field, Florida, 6 Feb 1943
 Walterboro Army Airfield, South Carolina, 3 Jul 1943
 Rice Army Airfield, California, 17 Sept 1943 – 9 Mar 1944
 RAF Fowlmere (AAF-378), England, 5 Apr 1944 – 7 Sept 1945
 Drew Field, Florida, c. 20 Sep – 7 Nov 1945
 Niagara Falls Municipal Airport, New York, 8 December 1948
 Dow Air Force Base, Maine, 2 March 1951

 Grenier Air Force Base, New Hampshire, 1 May 1951
 Larson Air Force Base, Washington, 2 August 1951 – 1 December 1952
 Niagara Falls Municipal Airport, New York, 1 December 1952
 Cannon Air Force Base, New Mexico, 16 January 1968
 Tuy Hoa Air Base, South Vietnam, 20 May 1968 – 5 June 1969
 Niagara Falls International Airport (later Niagara Falls Air Reserve Station), 5 June 1969
 Detachment operated from Charleston Air Force Base, South Carolina, July 1986 – June 1994

Aircraft

 A-24 Banshee, 1942–1943
 P-39 Airacobra, 1943–1944
 P-51D Mustang, 1944–1945
 F-47D Thunderbolt, 1948–1952
 F-51H Mustang, 1952–1954
 F-94B Starfire, 1954–1957
 F-86H Sabre, 1957–1960

 F-100C Super Sabre, 1960–1971
 F-101B Voodoo, 1971–1982
 F-4C Phantom II, 1982–1986
 F-4D Phantom II, 1986–1990
 Block 15 ADF F-16A/B Fighting Falcon, 1990–1994
 KC-135R Stratotanker, 1994–2008
 C-130H Hercules, 2008–2015
MQ-9 Reaper, 2015–present

References

 Maurer, Maurer. Combat Squadrons of the Air Force: World War II. Maxwell Air Force Base, Alabama: Office of Air Force History, 1982.
 Rogers, B. (2006). United States Air Force Unit Designations Since 1978. 
  Cornett, Lloyd H. and Johnson, Mildred W., A Handbook of Aerospace Defense Organization  1946 – 1980, Office of History, Aerospace Defense Center, Peterson AFB, CO (1980).
 New York Department of Military Affairs Adjutant General Reports, 1846–1988

Squadrons of the United States Air National Guard
Military units and formations in New York (state)
136